Garfield Heights High School is a public high school located in Garfield Heights, Ohio, about 10 miles southeast of downtown Cleveland, Ohio. It is part of the Garfield Heights City School District. The school currently contains approximately 1,300 students. The mascot is the Bulldog and the school colors are navy blue and gold.  The current principal is Tammy Hager.

New Performing Arts Center
Garfield Heights Board of Education presented the grand opening of the performing arts center on November 3, 2007. The building includes a 792-seat Auditorium, a make-up room, a storage room, several changing rooms for Music Express, Drama performers, and Band members, and two classrooms, one being the Band room, and another for the Choral department.

History
The school has recently received an "Effective" rating from the state of Ohio, the third highest rating a school can achieve. The district is fed by its own middle school and by three nearby parochial schools.

Athletics
The school's athletic teams are known as the Bulldogs and are independent of a league beginning with 2015-16.  They had been members of the Northeast Ohio Conference, from 2007-2015 with the exception of the Ice Hockey team which belongs to the Greater Cleveland High School Hockey League Blue Division. The school fields athletic teams in football, Track & Field. Also wrestling, baseball, soccer, tennis, golf, basketball, softball, and hockey.  The Ohio High School Athletic Association approved bowling as a sanctioned sport starting in the 2006-2007 school year. The 2005-2006 bowling team won a division and league championship.

Basketball team
The Garfield Heights High School boys’ basketball team won the 2008 Northeast Ohio Conference Championship after posting a 20-1 record. In the Warrensville Heights district they defeated Nordonia before being upset by Cleveland Heights in the semifinals.  The 2010-2011 team  reached the state Final Four before falling to Columbus North in the Division 1 semifinal game.

Ohio High School Athletic Association state championships

 Wrestling - 1960, 1994 
Volleyball - 1958, 1992

Clubs
The school also contains several student associations/clubs. The Students of Service program provides community service throughout the community and school. Other programs include: Drama Club, Art Club, Book Club, Tech Crew, Computer Club.

Academic Challenge Team

The GHHS Academic Challenge team has the highest winning percentage of any team in school history.  On May 5, 2007, the team participated in the Ohio Academic Competition (OAC) State Finals, where they won the OAC State Title, defeating defending state champion William V. Fisher Catholic High School in the finals. The team also got second place at the PACE Great Lakes Regional on April 14, 2008, losing to Stow-Munroe Falls High School.  On April 19, 2008, the team claimed its 2nd NAQT State Title and on May 3, 2008, the team repeated at OAC State Champions, defeating Solon High School in the finals 58-44.  The team started the 2007-2008 school year ranked #23 in the country and #1 in the state of Ohio.  The team represented Ohio at the Panasonic Academic Challenge in Orlando. In 2010 the team traveled to New Orleans to participate in a National Tournament. The team earned a spot at Nationals by winning the televised Academic Challenge on Cleveland's ABC network affiliate.

Academic awards
 2007-2008 GHHS Academic Team—OAC STATE CHAMPIONS
 2007-2008 GHHS Academic Team—NAQT State Champions
 2007-2008 GHHS Academic Team—Preseason Polls—1st in Ohio, 23rd Nationally
 2006-2007 GHHS Academic Team—OAC STATE CHAMPIONS
 2006-2007 GHHS Academic Team—NAQT Division I - 4th Place
(Team Captain Dan Humphrey was named State MVP)
 2005-2006 GHHS Academic Team—NAQT Division I State Champions
(Team Captain Jim Hrdlicka was named State MVP)
 2004-2005 GHHS Academic Team—NAQT Division I State Runners-Up
 1998-1999 GHHS Academic Team—OAC State Runners-Up
 1996-1997 GHHS Academic Team—OAC State Runners-Up
 1989-1990 GHHS Academic Team—OAC State Runners-Up
 1986-1988, 1990–2000, 2003–2008 GHHS Academic Team—Northeast Ohio Academic League Champions
 1989, 2001, 2002, 2009 GHHS Academic Team—Northeast Ohio Academic League Runners-Up

Notable alumni
Trey Lewis (born 1992) - basketball player in the Israeli Basketball Premier League
Carl Monday - Television news reporter
Phil Pozderac (born 1959) - Former Dallas Cowboys player
Wilma Smith - Television news anchor

External links
 Class of 1966 website (Alma mater)
 Class of 2006 website (Paul Glazer)

Notes and references

High schools in Cuyahoga County, Ohio
Public high schools in Ohio
Garfield Heights, Ohio